New Bongaigaon (is a city in the Indian state of Assam. The City included or new part of municipal board of Bongaigaon District. To meet the demands of Bodos of Assam, Bongaigaon was divided up to give way for Chirang district. Bongaigaon has a major petrochemical industry, the Indian Oil Corporation Limited (IOCL BGR).

The town occupied a place in the map of Indian Railways with the establishment of the railway station in the year 1908. Most of the institutions like ITI, Bongaigaon College, Office of the Assam State Electricity Board in the early 1960s and in fact the very base of the development of the town was laid in this decade only. The development further gained momentum with the establishment of the Bongaigaon Refinery and Petrochemicals Limited (BRPL) Complex in the year 1972 at Dhaligaon and also Thermal Power Plant at Salakati. Though these area are not within the limit of Bongaigaon Municipality the town also caters to the demand of this population.
The Bongaigaon Town Committee was first constituted in the year 1961 and was upgraded to a Municipal Board in the year 1977. Presently the Municipal Area consists of 25 nos. of wards covering an area of 14.31 sq m.

Railways

Bongaigaon falls under the Northeast Frontier Railway zone of the Indian Railways. There are two stations in Bongaigaon - New Bongaigaon railway station (2nd largest railway junction of Assam state) and Bongaigaon (old) station. Major trains serving Bongaigaon with major cities are Guwahati Rajdhani Express, Poorvottar Sampark Kranti Express, Saraighat Express, Brahmaputra Mail, North-East Express, Guwahati Bangalore Express, Guwahati Ernakulam Express, Kamrup Express. It is the largest station in Western Assam after Guwahati. According to 2012 budget, New Bongaigaon Jn. is considered to be the Adarsh Station of India.

It also was the reason for setting up the New Bongaigaon railway station.

New railway track from New Bongaigaon to Guwahati was commissioned in 1984.

Saraighat Bridge opened in 1962, initially carried a metre gauge track, which was later replaced by broad gauge.

Electrification of New Bongaigaon Rly. Jn.
Electrification of the Barauni-Katihar-Guwahati line was sanctioned in 2008. In the document on Vision 2020 – A Blue Print for Railway Electrification Programme, in the list of ongoing projects the entire route km (836) is shown as balance work as on 1 April 2010. The entire electrification project is scheduled to be completed by October, 2015.

See also
 Bongaigaon Municipal Board
 List of cities in Assam by population
 Bir Chilarai Flyover, Bongaigaon City
 New Bongaigaon railway station

References

External links

 District website

Cities and towns in Bongaigaon district
Bongaigaon